Kamikazee (or sometimes stylized as KMKZ) is a Filipino rock band formed in 2000. The band, originally known all throughout its career as a quintet, is currently composed of Jay Contreras (lead vocals), Jomal Linao (lead guitar and vocals), Led Tuyay (guitar), Puto Astete (bass), Bords Burdeos (drums), Jian Lubiano (guitar), and Mikki Jill (keyboards & vocals).

Fans and critics have described the band's music as a mix of pop punk and hardcore punk.

In August 2015, the band had temporarily reunited after a brief hiatus announced earlier in January 2015. By the beginning of 2016, the band officially entered an indefinite hiatus. They played their farewell concert on December 10, 2015, at the Smart Araneta Coliseum. Around 2017, the band had a reunion gig and has been touring since.

History

Formation and early years
The band is composed of five members who met at the College of Fine Arts of the University of the Philippines, Diliman. Kamikazee's early gigs were mostly on-campus events in UP Diliman like the annual UP Fair. Before they were signed to a major label, they went by the name "Kamikazee Cornflakes", eventually shortening the name to "Kamikazee". Their early shows included performances of the songs "Mmm Sarap", "Tsinelas", a cover of singer Ariel Rivera's "Sana Kahit Minsan", and Britney Spears' Lucky.

Their live performances have since been known for using expletives, sexually suggestive dances, and references to genitalia. Despite such antics, their music incorporates many elements of modern rock music, such as pop-punk, grunge and NU-metal, on some of their songs. Band drummer Bords Burdeos was also recognized for his drumwork, which according to fans and critics, added extra flair to the band's songs.

Kamikazee released their first studio album in 2002. The album's carrier single was a heavy cover version of Britney Spears' "Lucky". Other notable songs include "Girlfriend", "Ung Tagalog",  "Tsinelas" and their cover of Ariel Rivera's "Sana Kahit Minsan". In 2005, the band released "Chiksilog" as part of the Ragnarok MMORPG compilation album Rok On!.

Maharot and mainstream success
In 2006, they released their second album, "Maharot". The carrier single of the album was "Narda", which is about the fictional Filipina super hero Darna. "Narda" was a popular hit in 2006, and gained constant radio airplay in the same year, eventually becoming the band's signature song. The song was inspired by GMA Network's 2005 primetime show Darna which starred Angel Locsin. Later in 2009, it was used for GMA Network's primetime show Darna with Marian Rivera playing the title role. The band also borrowed from other genres of music in composing their songs for the album, as evidenced by the metal-inspired sound of the tracks "Sobrang Init" and "KKK", the pop-punk styling of the songs "Director's Cut" and "Martyr Nyebera" (spoof or pun name of balladeer Martin Nievera) and the reggae-sounding feel of "Petix". Maharot was recognized for its sound, and further propelled the band to mainstream success.

The band maintains close ties with another popular Filipino band, Parokya ni Edgar (PNE). PNE frontman Chito Miranda met the band members in college. In concert events with both bands on the bill, one band's singer would occasionally jam with the other band. During Parokya ni Edgar's live sessions, Contreras frequently joined Miranda in performing songs such as "Okatokat", "Chikinini" and "The Yes Yes Show." In 2005, Contreras provided back-up vocals for PNE's hit song "The Order Taker" while co-member Linao provided lead guitar. In turn, Kaye Abad, Miranda's then-girlfriend, provided back-up vocals for Kamikazee's song "Martyr Nyebera". Contreras later married Kaye Abad's sister, Sarah, on February 12, 2009, at Paco Park.

In December 2008 when Kamikazee was set to perform at the Dubai Festival City in Dubai, United Arab Emirates as part of an international tour, guitarist Led Tuyay was arrested at the airport upon their arrival after a cannabis residue was found in his luggage. Tuyay was detained and deported back to Manila in January 2009.

Long Time Noisy and Romantico
Kamikazee's 3rd Album "Long Time Noisy" took the band three years to put together as the band balanced out their tough schedules. The album was recorded at Tower of Doom Studios with producer Eric Perlas. "Unang Tikim," one of the album's singles, was used in the TV Ad of RC Cola in 2011. The album's writing style and music retained elements from their previous work, mainly in song structure and subject matter such as everyday life, drug use, and personal experiences.

Kamikazee's fourth & recent album,  "Romantico" was released after being in production for 3 years.  The album contained the singles "Halik" & "Huling Sayaw" with RNB singer Kyla on guest vocals. "Romantico" was well-received, despite minor criticism from some fans regarding the change of musical style in the album.

15th anniversary and indefinite hiatus
The band announced on January 25, 2015, that they would disband at the end of the year to pursue individual interests, although clarified that it was not a break up but merely a hiatus on band activities. The band told fans that they would surely see the band again in the future.

In August 2015 after a brief hiatus, the band performed a series of live performances dubbed as "Kamikazee XV" which marks their 15th anniversary in the OPM industry. Kamikazee held their last gig at the 12 Monkeys Music Hall & Pub in Makati as part of the "Kamikazee XV" concert series entitled Kamikazee Huling Sayaw (translated to Kamikazee The Last Dance) with Parokya ni Edgar's Chito Miranda as special guest. The band announced that they will formally enter into hiatus starting 2016. Their Huling Sayaw farewell concert was held at Smart Araneta Coliseum on December 10 which features other local bands and most notably singer Kyla.

Reunion and Tagpuan Tour (2017–present)
On 20 August 2017, The band announced on their Facebook page about their planned comeback through their statement: "Matagal na panahon. Magkikita muli...bagong kanta" meaning "Long time. We'll see each other again ... new song" and later set the date of release to be on December 9, 2017.

On November 11 Kamikazee announced a 2018 Tagpuan Tour inside and outside the Philippines via Facebook video. Cities/Countries included are Bulacan, Cavite, Baguio, Iloilo, Ilocos, Cebu, Lucena, Bicol, Laguna, Davao, Manila, Dubai, Singapore, U.S.A, and Canada. According to the band's teaser posters, the Tagpuan tour was set to kick off on December 9, 2017.

First confirmed date was March 16, 2018 – TagFest in Dubai. Kamikazee played alongside 6cyclemind, Moonstar88 and Teeth

Since 9 December 2017, Kamikazee have release two singles from their upcoming 2019 album: "Agimat" and "Leon".

In 2018, Kamikazee took part in a reunion tour around the Philippines, USA and Canada finally announcing on 4 January 2019 that they will tour again with Greyhoundz and Queso to USA, Canada and Philippines cities such as Iloilo, Manila, Cavite and Cebu.

Expanding as an ensemble, the group became a 7-piece band starting in 2020, adding Jian Lubiano of Catfight on guitar and Mikki Jill of FIONA on keyboards & vocals.

Members
Ferdinand Jay Contreras – lead vocals 
Jose Ma. Luis "Jomal" Linao – lead guitar, vocals 
Led Zeppelin Tuyay – rhythm and lead guitar ; backing vocals (2000–2021)
Jason "Puto" Astete – bass guitar 
Allan "Bords" Burdeos – drums, percussion 
Jianelli James "Jian" Lubiano – rhythm guitar 
Mikki Jill – keyboards, vocals 
Touring members 
Mark "Macoy" Estacio – drums 
Sep Roño (of Typecast) – drums

Discography

Studio albums

Compilation album

Collaboration albums
Supersize Rock (Warner Music Philippines, 2004)
Kami nAPO muna (Universal Records, 2006)
The Biggest OPM Hits Of The Year SUPER (Universal Records, 2006)
Rok On (Viva Records, 2005)
Pinoy Ako 2 (Star Music, 2005)
Palabas: The Best Of OPM TV & Movie Themes (Universal Records, 2006)
Kami nAPO muna ulit (Universal Records, 2007)
Another Biggest OPM Hits Of The Year SUPER 2 (Universal Records, 2007)
Astig...The Biggest Band Hits (Universal Records, 2008)
Super Astig Hits (Universal Records, 2016)

Singles
From The Album Kamikazee (2002)
"Ung Tagalog"
"Tsinelas"
"Girlfriend"
"Lucky" (cover from Britney Spears)
"Sana Kahit Minsan" (cover from Ariel Rivera)
From The Album Maharot (2006)
'"Chiksilog"
"Ambisyoso"
"Narda"
"Martyr Nyebera"
"Seksi Seksi"
"Director's Cut"
"Doo Bidoo" (cover from "APO Hiking Society, 2007)
From The Album Long Time Noisy (2009)
"Wala"
"Hanggang Tingin"
"Unang Tikim"
"Alay"
"Meron Akong Ano" (cover from the late Francis M, also features Biboy Garcia of Queso, Chito Miranda of Parokya ni Edgar, Reg Rubio of Greyhoundz and Ian Tayao of Queso/Wilabaliw)
From The Album Romantico (2012)
"Halik" 
"Tagpuan"
"Huling Sayaw" (feat. Kyla)
"Wo-Oh"
 "Tamis"
 "Kislap"

Other singles
Originally Taken From Brother Band, Parokya Ni Edgar's album, "Halina Sa Parokya" (2005)
The Ordertaker (Feat. Parokya Ni Edgar)
Theme song for First Day High film and Rexona commercial
"First Day High"
From The Album Kami nAPO Muna (2006)
"Doo Bidoo" – No. 1 Philippines
Theme Song for ABS-CBN's Komiks
"Komiks"

Other media

Commercial endorsements
Rexona
Teazz Ice Tea
Smart Buddy Me Na Me
Tanduay Rhum
Coca-Cola
RC Cola

Awards and nominations

References

External links

Kamikazee PinoyBanda Profile
Dyan-banda - Band's 30-minute Urban travelogue
Tower Of Doom Studios

Filipino rock music groups
Filipino punk rock groups
Universal Records (Philippines) artists
Musical groups from Quezon City
Musical groups established in 2000
Musical groups disestablished in 2015
Musical groups reestablished in 2017